Martin is an American television sitcom that aired for five seasons on Fox from August 27, 1992, to May 1, 1997. The show starred comedian and namesake Martin Lawrence as the titular character. Lawrence also played several other characters. Martin was one of Fox's highest-rated shows during the sitcom's run.

Broadcast history

Episodes

Premise
Martin Lawrence in the role of Martin Payne, a disc jockey, lives with his girlfriend Gina Waters (Tisha Campbell) in the city of Detroit, Michigan. Martin works for the fictional radio station WZUP and later, for local Public-access television station Channel 51, and the show covers events in their lives.

A common theme of the series is Martin's selfish and free-spirited nature. Martin's sharp tongue and lack of filter often lead to comedic situations and conflicts with those around him, making for an entertaining viewing experience.

In early episodes, Lawrence began with a monologue of him speaking directly to the camera and audience from the darkened radio studio. The only actor to appear in every episode as the same character is Thomas Mikal Ford as Tommy.

As the series progressed, plotlines saw Martin eventually move on to become the host of the talk show Word on the Street, which aired on the small Detroit public-access television station Channel 51. He retained this position until the series' final episode, in which he and Gina prepare to move to Los Angeles. Gina's best friend Pam, whom Mr. Whitaker let go two episodes earlier due to downsizing, goes on to pursue a career in the music industry as an artists & repertoire (A&R) executive at Keep It Real Records. This plotline became the subject of a backdoor pilot episode Goin' for Mine  [episode 129], that was included in the Martin series for a spin-off sitcom of the same name, starring Tichina Arnold, but the sitcom never materialized.

Characters

Main characters 
Martin Payne (Martin Lawrence) Martin, the title character, is a caring family man deep down, but on the outside a very macho, selfish smart aleck. Martin carries himself in a typical urban youth manner, with modern expressions and mannerisms. His girlfriend turned wife, Gina Waters, has sometimes tried to change him (much to his anger, seeing as he likes the way he acts), but this rarely worked. Martin is not much of a physical fighter despite trying to come off as such. He has a particularly antagonistic relationship with Gina's best friend Pam.

Gina Waters-Payne (Tisha Campbell), Martin's  professional, fun-loving, eternally romantic and forgiving girlfriend and later wife. She often acts as a peacemaker, admonishing others when they trade barbs and insults and breaking up fights. Gina works for a public-relations firm. She complements Martin's street savvy by serving as a voice of reason. She is also Pam's best friend.

Cole Brown (Carl Anthony Payne II), Martin's other best friend. Dimwitted but well-meaning and known for his eclectic taste in headgear, Cole proudly cleans jets at the airport for a living, drives an AMC Pacer, and lives with his mother Maddie until early Season Five. For a time in Season 3, Cole appeared to be attracted strictly to plus-sized women and dated a security guard named Big Shirley (who is fully seen in only one episode; another episode only showed "her" below the neck to portray her as being much taller and bigger than Cole). In the final season, after Cole meets Shanise and moves into his own apartment in a rough neighborhood, he dates Shanise, who appears to be even more dimwitted than he is. During the series finale, he becomes engaged to Shanise.

Thomas "Tommy" Strawn (Thomas Mikal Ford), one of Martin's best friends. Level-headed, intelligent, and charming, Tommy serves as another voice of reason, especially during Martin's schemes. He would often portray himself as a ladies' man and would flirt with Pam and other women on the show. He had a romantic relationship with Pam during the third and fourth seasons. His mysterious employment status was a running gag on the show, with everyone saying, "You ain't got no job!". Of all the male characters, he is the only one to have attended college. He is also the only character to appear physically in every episode.

Pamela "Pam" James (Tichina Arnold), Gina's sassy and ill-tempered co-worker, best friend and Tommy's girlfriend. Before eventually dating Tommy, Pam was always looking for a good man. In Season 1, Cole expressed interest in her but she doesn't return the interest. Pam worked at the PR firm where she was employed as Gina's assistant. Pam has a very adversarial relationship with Martin. When he insults her, she responds typically via belittling that brings attention to Martin's short stature. Pam has a beautiful singing voice that she displays throughout the show.

Shawn McDermott (Jon Gries) (seasons 1–2), the scatterbrained radio station engineer at WZUP. Martin always finds himself having rather strange conversations with him. Shawn often does things that upset their boss Stan, and once even tried to secure a record deal from Snoop Dogg when he was at an engagement party for Martin & Gina. It is revealed in the Season 2 Finale (Shawn's final appearance) that when Stan sold WZUP he was retained by the new station as an engineer, explaining to Martin that WEHA fired all the former WZUP DJs in favor of automated machines and that all he does is go into the station every 8 hours to switch out the radio tapes in the machines. This episode displayed a wiser, more serious side of Shawn as he gives Martin some advice on life that actually made sense, telling Martin to "find out where he needs to be." Martin takes this advice to heart and embarks on a journey of self discovery that ultimately leads to his talk show gig. After this episode, Shawn is never seen or mentioned again, with the exception of the Season 4 clip show "The Best of Martin" in which he appears via archive footage.

Stan Winters (Garrett Morris) (seasons 1–2; guest season 3), Martin and Shawn's boss, the owner and founder of radio station WZUP. He perpetually used too much cologne and wore woefully outdated clothing from the 1970s. Martin knew Stan to be cheap and quite untrustworthy, and just when Martin didn't think Stan could sink any lower with his schemes, Stan was always able to surprise him. Furthermore, Garrett Morris' real-life shooting resulted in his unexpected absence in the episode and a major change in the storyline, regarding Martin's career. Therefore, Stan was absent in the episode "The Hoedown in Motown" when he must shell out $20,000 in unpaid taxes, precipitating his sale of the radio station. He returned for one episode in Season 3 to form a partnership with Martin, and together they opened a restaurant—Marty Mart's Meatloaf and Waffles. Needless to say, their joint venture was a failure. After this episode, Stan was never seen or mentioned again. Garrett Morris had filmed a scene on his actual hospital bed when he gave Martin and Shawn a videotaped message, and called in from the hospital to tell Martin he sold WZUP to settle with the IRS.

Supporting characters 
Bruh-Man (Brother Man) (Reginald Ballard) (seasons 2–4): Martin's neighbor, who debuts in season two. He lives on the fifth "flo" (yet he always puts 4 fingers up when relating this fact), directly upstairs from Martin. Whenever Martin asks what he is doing, Bruh-Man replies, "Nuttin'…just chillin'." He often climbs down the "f-a-a-a-ah 'scape" (fire escape), to enter Martin's apartment, taking food, borrowing assorted items, and generally lounging around as if he lives there. At first, this greatly annoyed Martin but he eventually got used to it. In fact, fire escapes seem to be his only means of movement throughout buildings—he is seldom seen entering or exiting the apartment through the front door. When he attended Martin and Gina's engagement party at Gina's apartment, he went as far as climbing the building since there was no fire escape. Bruh-Man always wears badly fitting clothing a size or two too small (frequently, items he's "borrowed" from Martin), and has a characteristic gait consisting of a slow and lazy, rather limping, plodding walk, with his head cocked to one side. Martin, as Bruh-Man was heading toward the window to make his exit, once referred to it as his "slow bop". Bruh-Man speaks in a deep voice and with a long drawl, like that of Shaquille O'Neal. Despite being a popular character, Bruh-Man was quietly phased out of the series after season three. His last appearances were in the fourth season, and he explains his absence by stating that he only comes around when Martin and Gina are away out of respect for their marriage. This is proven true as he is absent throughout the fifth and final season of the series, however he is mentioned once albeit briefly. In episode 13, "Ain't That About a Ditch", when Gina's mother locks Martin out of his apartment, he pauses to think, then whispers "Bruh-Man" to himself as he walks off to climb in through the fire escape, then Martin shows up in his apartment.

Hustle Man (Tracy Morgan) (seasons 3–5): The neighborhood purveyor of questionable products and services "at a discount rate! I don't do dat for err'body! I'm just tryna help YOU out!" He always greets Martin with his trademark "What's happenin', chief?" In one episode, one of Hustle Man's more outrageous items for sale was an 'appetizing' array of roasted pigeons impaled on a tree branch (as if barbecued on it), which he attempted to sell to Martin and his friends while they were snowed in and starving. In another episode he served as Martin's cut-rate "wedding planner", armed with a shopping cart brimming with plastic flowers, chitlin loaf, and a 40-ounce bottle of malt liquor—Martin's retaliation for Gina's choice of a more elegant and ridiculously overpriced wedding planner.

Ms. Geri (Jeri Gray): She was a tough, trigger-happy senior who, regardless of her age and diminutive size, has no qualms about "whooping' ass". Most of her assaults are committed on Martin in everyday situations, such as standing in line at the DMV or at the unemployment office. On one occasion, her opponent was Dragonfly Jones (Lawrence), whom she soundly defeated as well, taking his money for good measure.

Shanise McGillicuddy (Maura McDade) (season 5) is Cole's girlfriend (and later fiancée), during the fifth and final season. Shanise is a very friendly woman. She always has a positive attitude. However, she is even more dimwitted than Cole. She and Cole briefly break up in one episode but this occurs because when she told Cole she needed more space, he assumed she meant she wanted to break up but she actually wanted a bigger apartment. She is also thoughtful and willing to help others. In the episode Over the Hoochie's Nest, she assists Martin, Tommy and Cole in rescuing Pam from an insane asylum. In the series finale, Cole wanted to ask Shanise to marry him. He had a hard time asking her due to him losing the ring. Shanise was even taken to get X-rayed in order for Cole to find the ring after he stuck it in cupcake. Finally, they become engaged when she is tricked into reading a letter that says "Will you marry me?" and Cole says yes to her. At the end of the episode, she is last seen helping the Paynes move out of their apartment as well as saying farewell to them. The character started minor but developed a grounded position in the group after Tisha Campbell briefly left the show.

Nipsey (Sean Lampkin) (seasons 3–5), the rotund, good-natured bartender who owns Nipsey's Lounge, the gang's favorite hangout.

Recurring characters 
Nadine Waters (Judyann Elder): Gina's doting and somewhat over-protective mother, who comes on as sophisticated, sweet and mild-mannered on the surface, but has shown a dark side on occasion—such as once getting immediately turned on by a brief scene from a porn video, and generally becoming quite flustered whenever conversation or situations turned to sexual subjects.

Dr. Cliff Waters (J.A. Preston): Gina's overbearing and overprotective father who works as a chiropractor. Instantly disliked Martin because he didn't feel he was good enough for his daughter. During the wedding rehearsal dinner, he threatens to start "capping" people, instantly inciting a major fight with members of the Payne family.

Lil' Dawg (Adrian Tibbs): A tall, lanky barber at Jim's Barber Shop whose unorthodox personal style is the subject of much ribbing in the workplace—he keeps his head nearly shaved, but grows a long mane of hair in back, and wears Coke-bottle-thick glasses. He is often seen at Nipsey's trolling for women (successfully!), and despite his looks and demeanor always seems to come out on top whenever he and Martin have a disagreement.

Buckwhite (Ray Massara): A very easygoing, tall white boy with a huge dark-coloured Afro, Buckwhite has been seen hanging out at Jim's Barber Shop, at Martin's apartment for various sporting events on TV, and at Nipsey's Lounge. He speaks Ebonics in an unaffected "normal" white manner. (Massara is actually a property master and special-effects assistant in the film and television industry; at the time of his appearances on Martin, he was that production's property master.)

Bro Fo' Real (Brother For Real) (Charlie Murphy): A faithful audience member of Martin's "Word on the Street" television program, and quite possibly Martin's number one fan. Bro Fo' Real attends every of Martin's taping for his show and encouraged Martin to be himself during one of the show's tapings (Season 3, Episode 14).

Angry Man (David Jean Thomas): A fellow audience member of Martin's "Word on the Street" television program, and often can be found in other locations such as the DMV. He is prone to stand up and shout "Man.... SIT-CHO ASS DOWN!!" when a guest (or anyone else, for that matter) says something he disagrees with.

Mr. and Mrs. Booker (Jeris Lee Poindexter and Ellia English): A married couple and audience members of Martin's "Word on the Street" television program. The Bookers are constantly arguing. Mr. Booker appears to be somewhat goofy and dimwitted, while Mrs. Booker is loud and aggressive. Their most prominent appearance is in the Season 4 episode "Kicked to the Curb", where they assist Martin and Gina in getting their apartment back, by scaring off the new tenants after Mrs. Booker pretends to be a scorned wife looking to fight the woman who was "creeping with her husband".

Maddie Brown (Laura Hayes): Cole's gossiping, no-nonsense mother who still supports him. She's known for talking about other people and spreading their business around. For example, Martin being broke and having Gina support him.

Evelyn Porter (LaWanda Page): A senior resident who lives in Martin's apartment building who is also friends with Mama Payne and Cole's mother, Maddie.

Reverend Leon Lonnie Love (David Alan Grier): A local fire-and-brimstone preacher whose brand of religion doesn't seem to frown upon avarice, lying, cheating, stealing, and philandering—even with his own cousin Pam.

Marian (Roxanne Reese): A seemingly well-heeled, middle-aged neighborhood alcoholic who often appears at parties, nightclubs, and gatherings, such as the audience on Martin's show Word on the Street and The Ladies League of Detroit. However, in one episode, she reveals that she is not drunk, that she is instead on medication.

Kenji (Kenneth Whack): Dragonfly's student.

Laquita (Simbi Khali): The nail stylist at Sheneneh's Sho' Nuff Hair Salon and Sheneneh's even-more vocal best friend.

Keylolo (Yo-Yo): A hairstylist at Sheenah's Sho' Nuff Hair Salon. She is also Sheneneh's sidekick.

Bonquisha (Kim Coles): Another one of Sheneneh's friends who always has bad breath. Bonquisha routinely claims that Keylolo is the one that has bad breath stating that was "eaten chitlins".

Sonny (Reno Wilson): Martin's shoplifting cousin who dresses and acts like Eddie Murphy.

Varnell Hill (Tommy Davidson): A successful talk show host who had been a WZUP DJ, leaving WZUP for greener pastures shortly after Martin began work there. When Martin was scheduled to open a community center, Stan bumped him in favor of Varnell being in town, setting events in motion for Martin. Varnell invited Martin to be on his show if he is ever in Hollywood, but when Martin shows up, he is ignored, causing Martin to see that success means nothing without integrity. Tommy Davidson reprised his role as Varnell Hill in 2020 as a guest on Martin Lawrence's cooking webshow, complete with a canary yellow suit.

Luis (Luis Antonio Ramos): The superintendent of the apartment building where Martin lives. In one episode, he marries Pam to avoid deportation.

Titus (Bentley Kyle Evans): A handsome well-dressed guy who is Gina's hairdresser, and seems to be attracted to Martin—affectionately calling him "Almond". (Evans was the executive producer of Martin; he made several cameo and voice-only appearances throughout the series, including one of the callers on WZUP, a guest at one of Gina's parties, and the only guy who appeared at an all-male fashion show that Pam and Tommy sponsored.)

Myra (BeBe Drake-Massey): Stan's girlfriend; they once double-dated with Martin and Gina (while Martin was on the outs with Cole, Pam and Tommy). She was a customer of Sheneneh's hair salon, and went bald after Gina treated her hair. She was last seen in season 3 working as a clerk at the unemployment office. After Martin leaves several low-paying jobs due to feeling he is making slow progress, Myra is fed up with him, but gets him a job after realizing he learned his lesson - buffing floors.

Gloria Rodriguez (Angelina Estrada): Station director and Martin's supervisor at television station Channel 51. Martin's work at Station 51 is more efficient than it was at WZUP, arguably because Mrs. Rodriguez is more professional in her duties than was Stan.

Bernice (Kymberly Newberry): A producer at Channel 51 who is always at odds with Martin. (Kymberly Newberry also briefly played an entirely different part of a shoe-saleswoman in episode 8 of season 2 "You've Got a Friend".)

Other roles played by Lawrence 
One of the trademark running gags of Martin, especially early in its run, was Lawrence playing multiple characters, utilizing various costumes and prosthetic appliances. This was often done as a plot device or comic relief. Season four was the last season to feature Lawrence as multiple characters on a regular basis. This technique was rarely used in Season 5, which was the final season of the series. The only characters that appeared in Season 5 were Sheneneh, Roscoe and Elroy. Mama Payne does not appear but her voice is heard in the holiday episode "Scrooge". Most of the other characters were last seen in Season 4 and the episodes they last appeared in seemingly wrote them out of the series.

Sheneneh Jenkins: Played by Martin, she is an exaggerated parody of a stereotypical "ghetto girl": she always has on flashy clothes/fashion accessories and hair weaves; nature has endowed her with a disproportionately oversized ghetto booty; and she speaks in African American Vernacular English. Sheneneh is the owner/operator of Sheneneh's Sho' Nuff Hair Salon. Mama Payne and Sheneneh were the only two characters Lawrence played as women on the show, and both characters hated Gina. Full of quirks, Sheneneh is tall and thick in build and often describes herself as a "la-a-a-dy. Some of her other catchphrases are "Oh mah goodnehhh! and "Aw-iight? at every other word, and "Oh, no you didn't." Sheneneh's portrayed as being a very feisty, belligerent, touchy, antagonistic, confrontational and disparaging diva, known for her ghetto fabulous scoldings. She lives in the apartment across the hallway from Martin's and factors into many of the plots by picking fights with Gina and especially Pam out in the hallway. Sheneneh has several girlfriends who occasionally appeared in the program, those being Keylolo (Yo-Yo), Bonquisha (Kim Coles), and Laquita (Simbi Khali). Of all the secondary characters played by Lawrence, Sheneneh is the only one to make an appearance in the final episode, though only her voice was heard. The nae nae dance, created in 2013, was inspired by the way Sheneneh danced in Martin, and was named after the character.

Edna (Mama) Payne: Martin's extremely frenetic, and easily excited mother, who is extremely over-protective of Martin, and who dislikes Gina immensely. Comically, Lawrence's mustache was never covered with stage make-up while in this role. Mama's mustache was occasionally the subject of a sharp retort by Gina when she and Martin argued. She has a brother named Junior (portrayed by John Witherspoon). Mama does not appear in the fifth and final season, but her voice is heard in the Christmas episode "Scrooge". She has the same catchphrase as her son Martin, "Damn! Damn! Daaaaamn!", a reference to the show Good Times.

Ol' Otis: A very abrasive, strict, stuttering and potbellied old man, who is always seen in uniform while on his job as a security guard. His catchphrase is repeatedly referring to males as "ba" [boy] and females as "ga" [girl]. Otis is usually seen melodramatically and hyperactively attempting to keep order whether there's trouble or not. Because of his immense gut, advanced age, and oafish appearance, Otis is often taken for a weak old man who just acts tough. Because of this, he's often challenged to physical fights following his abrasive behavior. Otis is always more than willing to oblige others in engaging in combat. Surprisingly through his buffoonish-styled wrestling, unexpected strength from Otis always catches his "antagonists" off guard, invariably making him the victor in the end. Otis's pet peeve is misconduct in the "younger generations". When all is said and done, he physically defeats all his much younger challengers with ease. In his final episode on the show, he moves to an undisclosed island. Otis does not appear in the fifth and final season.

Jerome: A loudmouthed, aging, somehow well-funded, once-flashy but now-faded Detroit pimp. He runs an illicit casino, sports a family-heirloom gold tooth ("gold toof-es") in his mouth, was once voted Detroit's "Player of the Year", and has his sights set on Pam, as when he occasionally calls her "Junk in the Trunk". He often speaks in rhyming sentences. Jerome is shown to be very intelligent, as when cashiers at a convenient store were talking about him in their native language, he reveals his fluency to them shocking. Usually Jerome appears on the scene with his signature spiel, "Oooh, oooh, oo-oo-ooh, I say Jerome's in the house, I say Jerome's in the ah-um-ah-um... house! watch yo' mouth!" Jerome's final appearance on the show is in the episode "Uptown Friday Night" (which parodies Uptown Saturday Night), in which his final line is "And that's the eeeend!" Jerome does not appear in the fifth and final season.

Roscoe: An antagonistic child with a perpetually runny nose and a very smart mouth, who can be considered Gina's arch-enemy (similar to Martin and Pam's rivalry). Lawrence played the role by "standing" on his knees, with shoes attached to his kneecaps. Roscoe only appears once during the first, fifth and final season.

Dragonfly Jones: A martial arts "expert" who is beaten up in nearly every appearance. He always seems to owe money to a real martial artist named Kenji, who is actually a student of Dragonfly. Kenji who would often beat up Dragonfly whenever he refuses to pay him some small sum he is owed. Dragonfly does not appear in the fifth and final season.

Bob: A white man who works in an unknown capacity at the marketing firm where Gina is employed, Bob is best described as a stereotypical surfer-dude-cum-redneck. He speaks in a Southern Californian accent mixed with a Southern twang, and often uses words like "dude" and "man", even in professional settings. Lawrence achieved a white appearance with stage make-up and a prosthetic nose appliance to make him appear Caucasian, as well as wearing a long, blond mullet wig to complete the look. Bob only appears in 2 episodes, once in the first season and again in the second season.

Elroy Preston: The fictional "Godfather of Black Surf Music" who is now completely forgotten and washed up. Preston works as an auto mechanic, and is best known for randomly breaking into song while performing his mechanical duties. He often distracts himself and irritates others when reminiscing on things that involve his trademark song, which consists only of Preston singing "Don't you know no good!" over and over. He makes one appearance in the fifth and final season.

King Beef: Cole's favorite 1970s blaxploitation movie actor, who is actually Lawrence in a huge bodysuit. Whenever trouble arises, he feels the overwhelming need to dance. It does not matter if he is on the run from Godzilla—he always finds time for dancing, and always with his scantily clad female co-stars flanking him. He is only seen during the first season.

Lawsuit 
In 1997, Tisha Campbell filed a lawsuit against her co-star Martin Lawrence and the show's producers for sexual harassment and verbal and physical assaults, and she did not appear in most of the season five episodes. The explanation in most of the episodes Campbell did not appear in was that Gina was "out on business", though in the two-part episode "Going Overboard" it was stated that Gina had arrived too late to board the boat for the trip alongside everyone else. HBO Studios eventually settled the case with Campbell so that the show's last season could be completed. Campbell did return to the Martin set to film the two-part series finale of the show under the condition that she would not share any scenes with or interact in any way with Lawrence. In the episode, Martin and Gina kept entering and exiting the sets at different times and the storyline was adjusted so that the characters were both parts of it but never crossed paths.

Awards and nominations

Syndication
Martin went into second run syndication on August 8, 1995, airing on local stations primarily of the WB and UPN (later merged as CW) and Fox affiliates mostly near the 10:30/11:00pm time-slots.

Martin formerly  aired reruns on TV One, WCIU, USA Network, VH1, and MTV2.

As of March 2023, BET air reruns of the series.

In 2009 it started to have a Spanish version aired on V-me, Azteca Latino, Sudamérica Televisión and in the Dominican Republic on Telemicro Channel 5.

Warner Bros. Television Distribution holds the national syndication rights of Martin.

Streaming
The series is able to be purchased on Amazon Prime Video, Google Play Movies & TV, YouTube, Vudu, and the iTunes Store as of July 2020.

The series is available to be streamed on BET+.

The series was added to HBO Max on November 1, 2021.

Home media
HBO Home Video has released all five seasons of Martin on DVD in Region 1.

References

External links 

 Official Website
 

1990s American black sitcoms
1990s American sitcoms
1992 American television series debuts
1997 American television series endings
English-language television shows
Fox Broadcasting Company original programming
Television series about radio
Television series about television
Television series by Warner Bros. Television Studios
Television shows set in Detroit
Television series by HBO Independent Productions